Sir Thomas Barclay (20 February 1853 – 20 January 1941) was a distinguished authority on International Law, a writer on economic subjects and a British Liberal politician.

Barclay was born at Dunfermline in 1853, the eldest son of George Barclay of Cupar.  He was educated at Cupar Academy, the College of Dunkirk, the Johanneum Classical School, Hamburg, University College, London, and the Universities of Paris and Jena.  Initially he followed his father's footsteps in being a journalist for The Times having written articles for various newspapers from 1876 and he was posted to their Paris office.  When he was called to the bar in 1881, he then devoted himself to a legal practice.

A former Liberal Unionist, he was a Member of Parliament (MP) for Blackburn (UK Parliament constituency) between the two general elections of 1910 (January and December). He was also a deputy Chairman of the International Law Association. From 1899 to 1900 he headed the British Chamber of commerce and economic work in France involving that helped lead to the Entente cordiale For these works he would be nominated for the Nobel Peace Prize in 1905, 1906, 1907, 1908, 1910, 1913, 1914, 1923, 1925, and 1928.

Barclay was knighted in the birthday honours of 1904.  He was married to Marie Thérèse Teuscher, the translator of Villiers de l'Isle Adam's "La Révolte"; the couple had three children.

References

External links 

 
 
 
 other books written by Barclay at archive.org

1853 births
1941 deaths
International law scholars
Liberal Party (UK) MPs for English constituencies
UK MPs 1910
Alumni of University College London
Politicians from Dunfermline
Liberal Unionist Party parliamentary candidates